The finite volume method (FVM) is a method for representing and evaluating partial differential equations in the form of algebraic equations.
In the finite volume method, volume integrals in a partial differential equation that contain a divergence term are converted to surface integrals, using the divergence theorem. 
These terms are then evaluated as fluxes at the surfaces of each finite volume. Because the flux entering a given volume is identical to that leaving the adjacent volume, these methods are conservative. Another advantage of the finite volume method is that it is easily formulated to allow for unstructured meshes. The method is used in many computational fluid dynamics packages.
"Finite volume" refers to the small volume surrounding each node point on a mesh.

Finite volume methods can be compared and contrasted with the finite difference methods, which approximate derivatives using nodal values, or finite element methods, which create local approximations of a solution using local data, and construct a global approximation by stitching them together. In contrast a finite volume method evaluates exact expressions for the average value of the solution over some volume, and uses this data to construct approximations of the solution within cells.

Example

Consider a simple 1D advection problem:

Conventionally, positive  represents flow to the right while negative  represents flow to the left.

and at time  as,

where  and  represent locations of the upstream and downstream faces or edges respectively of the  cell.

Integrating equation in time, we have:

where .

We assume that  is well behaved and that we can reverse the order of integration. Also, recall that flow is normal to the unit area of the cell. Now, since in one dimension , we can apply the divergence theorem, i.e. , and substitute for the volume integral of the divergence with the values of  evaluated at the cell surface (edges  and ) of the finite volume as follows:

where .

where values for the edge fluxes, can be reconstructed by interpolation or extrapolation of the cell averages. Equation is exact for the volume averages; i.e., no approximations have been made during its derivation.

This method can also be applied to a 2D situation by considering the north and south faces along with the east and west faces around a node.

General conservation law 

We can also consider the general conservation law problem, represented by the following PDE,

Here,  represents a vector of states and  represents the corresponding flux tensor. Again we can sub-divide the spatial domain into finite volumes or cells. For a particular cell, we take the volume integral over the total volume of the cell, which gives,

On integrating the first term to get the volume average and applying the divergence theorem to the second, this yields

Again, values for the edge fluxes can be reconstructed by interpolation or extrapolation of the cell averages. The actual numerical scheme will depend upon problem geometry and mesh construction. MUSCL reconstruction is often used in high resolution schemes where shocks or discontinuities are present in the solution.

Finite volume schemes are conservative as cell averages change through the edge fluxes. In other words, one cell's loss is always another cell's gain!

See also
Finite element method
Flux limiter
Godunov's scheme
Godunov's theorem
High-resolution scheme
KIVA (Software)
MIT General Circulation Model
MUSCL scheme
Sergei K. Godunov
Total variation diminishing
Finite volume method for unsteady flow

References

Further reading 
Eymard, R. Gallouët, T.   R., Herbin, R. (2000) The finite volume method  Handbook of Numerical Analysis, Vol. VII, 2000, p. 713–1020. Editors: P.G. Ciarlet and J.L. Lions.
Hirsch, C. (1990), Numerical Computation of Internal and External Flows, Volume 2: Computational Methods for Inviscid and Viscous Flows, Wiley.
Laney, Culbert B. (1998), Computational Gas Dynamics, Cambridge University Press.
LeVeque, Randall (1990), Numerical Methods for Conservation Laws, ETH Lectures in Mathematics Series, Birkhauser-Verlag.
LeVeque, Randall (2002), Finite Volume Methods for Hyperbolic Problems, Cambridge University Press.
Patankar, Suhas V. (1980), Numerical Heat Transfer and Fluid Flow, Hemisphere.
Tannehill, John C., et al., (1997), Computational Fluid mechanics and Heat Transfer, 2nd Ed., Taylor and Francis.
Toro, E. F. (1999), Riemann Solvers and Numerical Methods for Fluid Dynamics, Springer-Verlag.
Wesseling, Pieter (2001), Principles of Computational Fluid Dynamics, Springer-Verlag.

External links
 Finite volume methods by R. Eymard, T Gallouët and R. Herbin, update of the article published in Handbook of Numerical Analysis, 2000
 , available under the GFDL.
 FiPy: A Finite Volume PDE Solver Using Python from NIST.
 CLAWPACK: a software package designed to compute numerical solutions to hyperbolic partial differential equations using a wave propagation approach

Numerical differential equations
Computational fluid dynamics
Numerical analysis